is a Japanese football player who plays for Tochigi SC.

Club statistics
Updated to 23 February 2018.

1Includes Japanese Super Cup.

References

External links

1981 births
Living people
Ryutsu Keizai University alumni
Association football people from Ibaraki Prefecture
Japanese footballers
J1 League players
J2 League players
FC Tokyo players
Omiya Ardija players
Tochigi SC players
Association football goalkeepers
Universiade gold medalists for Japan
Universiade medalists in football